Boqvist is a surname of Swedish origin. Notable people with the surname include:

Adam Boqvist (born 2000), Swedish professional ice hockey defenceman
Jesper Boqvist (born 1998), Swedish professional ice hockey centre
Lina Boqvist (born 1991), Swedish professional golfer

See also
Boquist